Bayeté Ross Smith (born 1976) is a contemporary African American multi-media artist, film maker and educator, working at the intersection of photography, film & video, visual journalism, 3D objects and new media. He currently lives and works in Harlem.

Early life
Ross Smith was born in Greenfield, Massachusetts and was raised in New York City, in Manhattan.

Education 
Smith went to Amherst Regional High School in Massachusetts. For his undergraduate studies, he attended Florida A&M University from where he graduated with a Bachelor of Fine Arts degree in Photography in 1999. He obtained his Master of Fine Arts (MFA) degree in Photography from the California College of the Arts.

Career
Ross Smith uses identity and community concepts to study and deconstruct notions of beauty, value, and reciprocity. Additionally, he examined how identity and community form the basis of human interactions and social systems. His work critiques preconceived notions, bias, and unconscious bias. A key point of reflection is questioning who controls the images and media that define people and cultures globally, domestically, and locally, and what role limited notions of history play in these representations.

Ross Smith began his career as a photojournalist with the Knight Ridder working for the Philadelphia Inquirer, Charlotte Observer, and Tallahassee Democrat. He later began working with video, audio, multimedia, found objects, archival imagery, and installations. His work takes on elements of documentary and non-fiction storytelling woven with imagination and experimental visual representation. His work is in the collections of The Smithsonian Institution, the Oakland Museum of California, the Birmingham Museum of Art, the Schomburg Center for Research in Black Culture, and The Brooklyn Museum. Ross Smith’s work has been exhibited in other countries including the Goethe Institute (Ghana), Foto Museum (Belgium), the Lianzhou Foto Festival (China), and America House (Ukraine), among others. His work has been published in numerous, media publications, books, and magazines, including The New York Times, The Guardian, PBS, National Geographic Learning, as well as Question Bridge: Black Males in America, "Dis:Integration: The Splintering of Black America" by Eugene Robinson; "Posing Beauty: African American Images from the 1890s to the Present" and "Black: A Celebration of A Culture" by Deborah Willis, "The Spirit of Family" by Al Gore and Tipper Gore, among others.

His project "Question Bridge: Black Males", created in collaboration with Hank Willis Thomas, Kamal Sinclair, and Chris Johnson, aims to represent and redefine black male identity in America through a video-mediated question and answer exchange that addresses the economic, political, geographic and generational divisions for Black men.

Ross Smith’s ongoing series of site-specific sculptures constructed from vintage boomboxes, entitled “Got The Power: Boomboxes”, combines music and oral history to create portraits of diverse communities around the world. These sculptures have been installed at multiple locations across the United States.

Other works by Ross Smith include Our Kind of People, a series of large-scale photographs and videos and a social media campaign that examines perception based on appearance and deconstructs how clothing, race, gender, and class signifiers affect our daily interactions and social systems.

In the Spring of 2021, Ross Smith began producing and publishing “Red Summers VR” with writer Jimmie Briggs and The Guardian US. Red Summers is a 360 immersive video series that examines the untold and under-told history of racial [domestic] terrorism in America from 1917-1921 (Red Summer, East St. Louis Race Riots, Houston Race Riot of 1917, Tulsa Race Massacre) through testimonials from [historians] and descendants of survivors and local community members.

Awards and other projects 
Bayeté Ross Smith is the recipient of numerous awards, grants, and fellowships. He is Columbia Law School’s inaugural Artist-In-Residence, a Presidential Leadership Scholar, a TED Resident, a Creative Capital Awardee, an Art For Justice Fund Grantee, a CatchLight Fellow, a BPMPlus Grantee, and an AmDOC/POV NY Times embedded media maker. 

In 2017, Ross Smith presented a TED talk about how USA has an opportunity to set a global example by honoring the diversity of its people and cultivating this resource as an asset. Ross Smith examined how the diversity of thought that comes from these cultural differences, is pivotal to a prosperous future. 

He has been an artist-in-residence at the  McColl Center for Art and Innovation, in Charlotte, North Carolina; the Kala Institute, Berkeley, California; the Laundromat Project, New York NY; and with Franconia Sculpture Park and the Jerome Foundation, Minnesota and New York City.

As an educator, Ross Smith has been a faculty member at NYU’s Tisch School of the Arts in both the Department of Photography and Imaging and the Open Arts Department since 2012. He was appointed the inaugural Artist-In-Residence at Columbia University’s Law School in 2021. He has also been a faculty member at the California College of the Arts, Parsons School of Design at the New School, St. Thomas University Law School, and the International Center of Photography.

In addition to his creative work, Ross Smith has been involved in a variety of community and youth development work. He helped launch and continues to work with the Kings Against Violence Initiative (KAVI), a hospital and school-based violence prevention organization based in Brooklyn NY that partners with Kings County Hospital. He is currently the Creative Director and an advisory board member for Self Evident Education, a digital humanities resource and community of educators that support critical thinking about the role of race and institutional racism throughout United States history. He has worked extensively with the International Center of Photography’s Community Programs at The Point CDC in the South Bronx and with the Youth Justice Network (formerly Friends of Island Academy) and CASES (Center for Alternative Sentencing and Employment Services). He also ran a youth photography program for several years at the East Oakland Youth Development Center in East Oakland, California.

References

External links
 Official website
 The Dr.Vibe Show  Chris Johnson And Bayete Ross Smith Of The 'Question Bridge'
Question Bridge, official site

1976 births
Living people
African-American contemporary artists
American contemporary artists
American photographers
Artists from New York (state)
African-American photographers
21st-century African-American people
20th-century African-American people
Amherst Regional High School (Massachusetts) alumni